Isabela Soares de Souza  (born January 13, 1998) is a Brazilian actress, singer and model who is known for her roles as Brida in the Disney Channel Brazilian series Juacas (2017–2019) and Beatriz Urquiza in the Disney Channel Latin America original series Bia.

Life and career 
Isabela Soares de Souza Marques was born on January 13, 1998, in Belo Horizonte, Minas Gerais. At age 10, Souza moved with her family to Rio de Janeiro and she began her artistic training at the Centro de Capacitação Profissional em Artes Cênicas.

Her first professional acting experience was in 2014, after participating in the play, Verão Sem Fim. A year later, she was selected from a casting to play Brida in Juacas, an original series produced by Disney Channel Brazil, where she moved to Florianópolis to take surfing lessons and participate in the filming of the series.

In 2018, she performed the song "Minha Vez", for the Brazilian soundtrack of the animated series, Elena of Avalor.

In May 2018, she was selected to play Bia Urquiza, the titular and main character of the Disney Channel Latin American original production, BIA, along with her co-star, Spanish actor, Julio Peña, who plays Manuel Gutierrez. , She had to move to Buenos Aires, Argentina and learn Spanish to be able to play the role.

In 2019, she was selected to be part of the Latin American and Brazilian soundtrack of the movie Aladdin where she performed "Callar" and "Ninguém me cala", versions in Spanish and Portuguese of the song "Speechless".

In January 2020, it was announced that Souza would be part of the jury at the Viña del Mar Festival in Chile. In April of the same year, was the release of "Vamos a mi ritmo", a song by Lasso in collaboration with Isabela, which is part of the EP "Cuatro temporadas: Primavera". The video was recorded in Mexico and released on April 24, 2020. In 2021, she released the singles "Anyone" (cover of Justin Bieber's single) and  "Cliché", both in collaboration with the singer Vitória Frozi.

Filmography

Awards and nominations

References 

Living people
1998 births
Brazilian actresses
21st-century Brazilian women singers
21st-century Brazilian singers
People from Belo Horizonte